The Palm Springs Police Department (PSDP) is the agency responsible for law enforcement within the city of Palm Springs, California. The headquarters is located at 200 South Civic Drive.

The mission of the department is "The men and women of the Palm Springs Police Department, empowered by and in partnership with the community, are dedicated to providing professional, ethical, and courteous service to all."

On October 8, 2016, two police officers, Jose "Gil" Vega and Lesley Zerebny, were shot and killed in the line of duty, the first since 1962. In 2017, a section of California State Route 111 was designated the "Officer Jose 'Gil' Vega and Officer Lesley Zerebny Memorial Highway" in their honor.

See also
List of law enforcement agencies in California

References

Municipal police departments of California